Vaughn Patrick Covil (born July 26, 2003) is an American professional soccer player who plays as a winger and forward for Hull City.

Club career
Born in San Diego, California, Covil attended Bishop Wordsworth's School while playing youth soccer for Amesbury Town and Salisbury. In 2014, Covil joined the academy at Southampton, staying with the club for five years. In June 2019, Covil signed for EFL League Two club Forest Green Rovers. On October 8, 2019, Covil made his debut for Forest Green at 16 years old, in a 0–0 EFL Trophy draw against Coventry City, scoring a penalty in an 8–7 penalty shoot-out win. During the 2020–21 season, Covil was loaned out to Salisbury. The following season, Covil went out on loan to Melksham Town.

On July 6, 2022, Covil signed a one-year deal with Hull City, with the club holding an option of a further year. Covil featured in the 60th minute in a pre-season friendly against Fenerbache in Istanbul; started against Brighton and came on in the 65th minute against Malaga during first team pre-season tour in Marbella, Spain. Covil was named on the bench in the inaugural Corendon Cup which Hull City lost 0-4 to Leicester City F.C. The final pre-season friendly saw Covil start and help City win 1-2 against League 1 side Cambridge United. Covil made his debut as an 84th-minute substitute for Allahyar Sayyadmanesh on July 30, 2022, in the home match against Bristol City.

International career
Covil holds dual American and British nationality and has been called up for England under-15's and the United States under-16's.

Career statistics

References

2003 births
Living people
People educated at Bishop Wordsworth's School
English people of American descent
English footballers
Association football wingers
Association football forwards
England youth international footballers
United States men's youth international soccer players
Forest Green Rovers F.C. players
Salisbury F.C. players
Melksham Town F.C. players
Hull City A.F.C. players
English Football League players